Altas Horas is a Brazilian television program broadcast by Rede Globo since 2000. It is hosted by Serginho Groisman.

External links 
 

Rede Globo original programming
Brazilian television talk shows
Portuguese-language television shows
2000 Brazilian television series debuts
2000s Brazilian television series
2010s Brazilian television series
2020s Brazilian television series